"Excuse Me (I Think I've Got a Heartache)" is a song co-written and recorded by American country music artist Buck Owens. The song peaked at number 2 on the U.S. Billboard Hot Country Singles chart.

Chart performance

References

1960 singles
Buck Owens songs
Songs written by Buck Owens
Songs written by Harlan Howard
1960 songs